These are the results of the women's individual all-around competition, one of six events for female competitors in artistic gymnastics at the 1992 Summer Olympics in Barcelona.  The qualification and final rounds took place on July 26, 28 and 30th at the Palau d'Esports de Barcelona.

Results

Final

Remaining placings

References

External links
Official Olympic Report
www.gymnasticsresults.com

Women's individual all-around
1992 in women's gymnastics
Women's events at the 1992 Summer Olympics